Abrothallus boomii is a species of lichenicolous fungus in the family Abrothallaceae. Found in Portugal, it was formally described as a new species in 2015 by Ave Suija and Sergio Pérez-Ortega. It is only known to occur at the type locality. The species epithet honours Dutch lichenologist Pieter van den Boom, "author of a long list of research articles and indefatigable collector of lichens and lichenicolous fungi".

Compared to other Abrothallus fungi that grow on Nephroma, Abrothallus boomii differs in that its asci contain six spores, its  are semi-immersed, and its hyaline  typically measure 7–10.5 by 5.5–8 μm.

References

boomii
Lichenicolous fungi
Fungi described in 2015
Fungi of Europe
Taxa named by Ave Suija